The Autovía A-10 (also known as Sakanako Autobia) is an autovía in Navarre. Built between 1992 and 1995 as an upgrade of the N-240 road, it received the A-10 designation in 2003 as part of the general renumbering of Spanish autovías.

Sections

Exits

References 

A-10
A-10